Competitor for  Canada
 

Red Jacket (born 15 April 1879, date of death unknown) was a Canadian lacrosse player who competed in the 1904 Summer Olympics. In 1904 he was member of the Mohawk Indians Lacrosse Team which won the bronze medal in the lacrosse tournament.

References

External links
 Profile at Sports Reference.com
 Mallon, Bill (1999). The 1904 Olympic Games Results for All Competitors in All Events, with Commentary. Jefferson: NC: McFarland. pp. 165–167.

1879 births
Year of death missing
Canadian lacrosse players
Lacrosse players at the 1904 Summer Olympics
Olympic bronze medalists for Canada
Olympic lacrosse players of Canada
First Nations sportspeople
Canadian Mohawk people